Dahisar (Marathi pronunciation: [d̪əɦisəɾ]) is the northernmost suburb (and railway station) of Mumbai. Dahisar is the first locality of Mumbai from the north. The suburb is a very cosmopolitan suburb, which has a large Gujarati population, the Marathi are the second most visible group in the suburb. Not to be confused with Dahisar Mori in Navi Mumbai.
 

On the Mumbai Suburban Railway (which is part of the Indian Western Railway line), that runs from Churchgate to Virar, Dahisar is immediately north and next to the populous suburb of Borivali, which has a train station of the same name.
 
After Dahisar, when travelling northwards on the Churchgate - Virar Western Railway line the immediate next railway station or stop is Mira Road station.

History
There is a record of continuous habitation since the 1630s, as per parish records of the Our Lady of the Immaculate Conception Church.. The word is most probably coming from the ancient Prakrit language of which a Sanskritized version would be Dadhīśvaraḥ (=IAST, Dadhishvar).

Dahisar was originally a part of Thane District; it became a part of Mumbai in 1956.

References

Mumbai Suburban district
Suburbs of Mumbai